Hanumanpur is a village in Jhunjhunu district, Rajasthan, India.

Villages in Jhunjhunu district